The Ekdala War was a long-lasting conflict between the Bengal Sultanate and the Delhi Sultanate which took place in the islets of Ekdala in Bengal. The war resulted in Delhi eventually recognising the independence of Bengal.

Background
In the early 14th century, Delhi's rebel governors in Bengal formed their own sultanates. By 1352, Shamsuddin Ilyas Shah defeated other rulers in Bengal and united the region into one sultanate. Ilyas Shah proclaimed himself as the Sultan of Bengal. Ilyas Shah's earlier military campaigns also involved the sacking of Kathmandu and Varanasi; and an invasion of Orissa.

Location
The conflict centered on the mud fort of Ekdala. The fort was located on an island surrounded by a moat and marshy jungle. The exact location of the area is unclear; with various sources saying it may have been in Dinajpur, Dhaka or Pandua.

First Ekdala War
In 1353, the Sultan of Delhi Firuz Shah Tughluq led 70,000 of his men into Bengal. They rested at the banks of the Kosi River which was difficult to cross, and they could also see some of Ilyas Shah's forces posted on the other side near the Ganges Junction. When news of this reached Ilyas Shah, he deserted his capital at Pandua and took shelter in the Fort of Ekdala. The Delhi army then besieged the fort, but was deterred by its island's location and the Bengal navy. According to erstwhile Delhi accounts, the two forces engaged in a battle after the Delhi Sultan tricked Ilyas Shah into attacking Delhi forces, who had pretended to withdraw. The Delhi army occupied Lakhnauti and issued a proclamation asking locals to pledge allegiance to Delhi. With the Bengal army scattered across, Ilyas Shah had fled with seven horsemen as three of his elephants were killed and 48 captured. According to erstwhile Delhi accounts, Firuz Shah Tughlaq's forces were victorious but did not annex the territory upon the wish of their Sultan, who had learnt from historic incidents with rebellious governors. The Sultan of Delhi also renamed Ekdala to Azadpur (akin to Freetown) and Pandua to Firozabad (after himself). After the forces had set off for Delhi following the victory, Ilyas Shah entered Ekdala and executed the governor put in charge. Other sources claim that the conflict was settled after Bengal agreed to pay an annual tribute to Delhi, and that the exchange of gifts between Delhi and Bengal indicated each other's sovereignty.

Siege of Ekdala (1359)
Firuz Shah Tughluq again invaded Bengal in 1359 when Ilyas Shah's successor Sikandar Shah took the throne. Tughluq felt Sikandar Shah had violated the terms of the treaty reached with his father. Tughluq sought to place the son-in-law of one of Ilyas Shah's rivals as the sultan of Bengal. During the invasion, Sikandar Shah based himself in Ekdala fort like his father.

The Delhi army besieged the island fort for months. After growing exhausted of Bengal's climate, the Delhi Sultan reached a peace treaty with Sikandar Shah. Delhi recognized Sikandar as an independent ruler. The peace treaty ensured Bengal's independence for two centuries.

References

Military history of the Bengal Sultanate
Delhi Sultanate